The following is a list of notable straw polls for the 2016 Democratic Party's presidential nomination.

October 8-18, 2015 - Georgia National Fair "Peanut Poll" Straw Poll

2015 Democratic Party of Wisconsin Straw Poll
511 delegates, alternates, and registered guests at the Wisconsin party convention on June 6, 2015.

* Write-ins

2014 Democratic Party of Wisconsin Straw Poll

323 delegates, June 7th

References

Opinion polling for the 2016 United States presidential election
2016 United States Democratic presidential primaries